The East Branch Union River is a  river in Hancock County, Maine. The lower section of the East Branch forms the border between Mariaville and  Waltham.

See also
List of rivers of Maine

References

Maine Streamflow Data from the USGS
Maine Watershed Data From Environmental Protection Agency

Rivers of Hancock County, Maine
Rivers of Maine